Abimana Aryasatya (born Robertino; October 24, 1982) is an Indonesian actor and film producer. He is best known for starring in the films Shackled (2012),  (2013), Haji Backpacker (2014), and in the highest-grossing Indonesian film of all time,  (2016).

Career

1995–2010: early career
Abimana began his entertainment career in 1997 as stand-in and film crew in television series or movies. in 1999 he started his first role debut as supporting actor in Indonesian popular TV series Lupus Millenia under the name Robertino.

He made his big screen debut in 2005 with Missing and 12.00 AM. Just as his acting career was starting to kick off, Abimana vanished from the industry in 2006. In an interview with The Jakarta Post in October 2014 Abimana stated that at the time, he felt he had had enough of acting and just wanted to get away from the entertainment world, saying, "Acting has never been the only choice for me. At that time, I felt that there was too much drama and backstage politicking in the entertainment world". During the hiatus, he took his wife, Inong Ayu, to Semarang in Central Java, where he started a culinary business.

However, he still appear in low budget movies such as Miracle: Menantang Maut (2007), Malam Jumat Kliwon (2007) and Rudi Soedjarwo 2008 Film, Sebelah mata.

2010–2013: career comeback and breakthrough 
After a hiatus of five years, In 2010, he made comeback to small screen with soap opera Sinar.
In 2011 he decided to change his name to Abimana Aryasatya, also in the same year his breakthrough role arrived when he starred opposite actor Ario Bayu, Carissa Putri, and Didi Petet in the film Catatan (Harian) Si Boy a reboot of the 1987 film Catatan Si Boy. He received his first Indonesian Movie award Nomination for Best Supporting Actor and Favorite Supporting Actor at the 6th Annual Indonesian Movie Awards.
The film established him as a promising film star and leading man and led him continued his career with leading roles in films such as Dilema (2012), Keumala (2012), Sang Pialang (2013), Coboy Junior: The Movie (2013) and isyarat (2013)

In 2012, Abimana starred in the horror-thriller movie Shackled with Imelda Therinne and Laudya Cynthia Bella. In the movie, he plays Elang, a youth who experiences mental illness. He was nominated in numerous awards for his performance, such as, Best Male Leading Actor at the 2013 Indonesian Film Festival, Favorite Actor and Best Actor at the 2013 Indonesian Movie Awards, and Best Actor in a Leading Role at the 2013 Maya Awards. The same year, he also starred in the film Republik Twitter as Lead actor with Laura Basuki and Tio Pakusadewo. He formed the band Drona with Ario Bayu and one of their singles, "Gadis Dalam Mimpi", was used in the soundtrack of the movie Republik Twitter.

In 2013, he was cast to replacing Noah's vocalist, Nazril Irham, as Arai in the third Installment of Laskar Pelangi franchises Edensor.

2013–present: rising popularity and widespread recognition

His popularity skyrocketed and gain widespread recognition when he starred alongside Acha Septriasa in the 2013 Indonesia blockbuster film  adaptation from novel with the same name. This movie, a Maxima Pictures film, was the studio's most expensive movie when released, with a budget exceeding 15 billion rupiah. It received praise from the President of Indonesia, Susilo Bambang Yudhoyono, during its premiere at Djakarta Theater on November 29, 2013.

In 2014, Abimana starred as Mada in Haji Backpacker. His character travels overland to Mecca through  Indonesia, Thailand, Vietnam, China, India, Tibet, Nepal, Iran, and Saudi Arabia.
His performance received praise both from critics and public and he was nominated for Best Male Leading Actor at the Indonesian Film Festival for the second time, and also for Favorite Actor and Best Actor at the 2013 Indonesian Movie Awards.

In 2016, he portrayed indonesian famous comedian Dono in remake comedy film, . The film went on to become the highest-grossing Indonesian film of all time, grossing more than 6.8 Billion in admission.

2018 become his debut year as a producer, he collaborated with Fourcolour Films to produced family films The Adventure of a Thunder Catcher and also co-produce Timo Tjahjanto horror movies May the Devil Take You.
at the same year he also played alongside Iko Uwais, Joe Taslim and Julie Estelle in Netflix original films The Night Comes for Us.
In October 2018 at Indonesia Comic-Con, it was announced that Abimana will star in Joko Anwar's Highly anticipated superhero film Gundala. 

In 2022, Abimana starred in The big 4, a Netflix Action Comedy directed by Timo Tjahjanto. Upon release, The Big 4 is the second most watched non-English-language film of the week, The Big 4 also entered Netflix’s top 10 country film lists in 53 countries, including Indonesia where it is the top-ranked film title. It appeared in the top ten in countries including Argentina, Mexico, Finland, Spain and Greece. Within Asia it ranked in the top ten in The Philippines, South Korea, Taiwan, Thailand, U.S and Vietnam.

Personal life
Abimana was born on October 24, 1982, in Jakarta, Indonesia. He is the only child of Spanish father, Roberto Candelas Aguinaga, and Chinese Indonesian mother, 
Ie Siu Khiauw. Previously known as Robertino, In 2011 he changed his name to Abimana Aryasatya because Robertino is his father's name. "I never see my father, and I am uncomfortable using that name," he explains. "By changing my name, I want to become a new person and apart from the shadow of my father and my past". He has been practicing Islam since he was around the age of 13.

In 2001, he married Indonesian Actress and Model Inong Nindya Ayu. Together, they have four children. After years of searching his biological father, he eventually met him for the first time after 33 years, where his father currently reside in Durango.

Filmography

Film

Television Series

Music video

Awards and nominations

References

External links
 
 

1982 births
Indo people
21st-century Indonesian male actors
Male actors from Jakarta
Indonesian people of Spanish descent
Indonesian people of Chinese descent
Living people
Indonesian male film actors
Indonesian male television actors
Converts to Islam
Indonesian former Christians
Indonesian Muslims